Digvijaya Singh Ministry (1998–2003) was the Council of Ministers in the Madhya Pradesh Legislative Assembly headed by Chief Minister Digvijaya Singh.

Council members 

 Digvijaya Singh – Chief Minister of Madhya Pradesh
 Jamuna Devi – Minister of women and child welfare
 Urmila Singh – Minister of tribal welfare
 Col Ajay Narayan Mushran – Minister of women and child welfare
 Nand Kumar Patel – Minister of Home and aviation minister
 Narendra Nahata – Minister of commerce and industries
 Mahendra Singh Kalukheda – Minister of agriculture, co-operation and ayacut 
 Subhash Kumar Sojatia – Minister of public health and welfare, medical education 
 Deepak Saxena – Minister of public health engineering
 Hukum Singh Karada – Minister of energy
 Indrajit Kumar Patel – Minister of housing and environment
 Ravindra Choubey – Minister of general administration, public relations, and public grievances
 Satyanarayan Sharma – Minister of commercial taxes, including excise
 Ajay Singh Rahul Bhaiya – Minister of panchayat and rural development, tourism and culture
 Ram Chandra Singh Deo – Minister of water resources (irrigation) development
 Vijayalaxmi Sadho – Minister of Narmada Valley Development Authority
 Shravan Patel – Minister of public works, sports and youth welfare 
 Prem Sai Singh – Minister of revenue and rehabilitation
 Mahendra Bodh – Minister of education while higher education, mining
 Ratnesh Soloman – Minister of forest
 Krishna Kumar Gupta – Minister of manpower planning
 Chanesh Ram Ratiya – Minister of animal husbandry and fisheries 
 Dhanesh Patila – Minister of scheduled caste welfare, dairy development, and jails
 Doman Singh Nagpure – Minister of state with independent charge labour, social welfare, and backward classes welfare
 Arif Aqueel – Minister of independent charge of minorities welfare, Bhopal gas tragedy relief and rehabilitation, and food
Bhupesh Baghel – minister of transport

References 

Cabinets established in 1998
1998 establishments in Madhya Pradesh
Singh 02
Indian National Congress state ministries
Cabinets disestablished in 2003
2003 disestablishments in India